The Republic of Vanuatu has the world's highest linguistic density per capita.

For a population of 0.3 million, Vanuatu is home to 138 indigenous Oceanic languages.

In addition, modern history has brought new languages, including the country's three official languages: English, French, and Bislama.

Even more languages have been brought by recent migrations (e.g. Samoan, Hakka Chinese, Mandarin Chinese).

The linguistic situation in Vanuatu

Indigenous languages
There are over one hundred local languages spread over the archipelago (listed below), all of them belonging to the Austronesian family of languages.

Vanuatu is the country with the highest density of languages per capita in the world: it currently shows an average of about 1,760 speakers for each indigenous language, and went through a historical low of 565; only Papua New Guinea comes close. Some of these languages are very endangered, with only a handful of speakers, and indeed several have become extinct in recent times. Generally however, despite the low numbers for most of the indigenous languages, they are not considered especially vulnerable to extinction.

Bislama

Bislama, a creole language derived from English, similar to Tok Pisin of Papua New Guinea and other nearby creoles, is the first language of many urban ni-Vanuatu, that is, the residents of Port Vila and Luganville; it is the most common second language elsewhere in the Vanuatu islands.

In recent years, the use of Bislama as a first language has considerably encroached on indigenous languages, whose use in the population has receded from 73.1 to 63.2 percent between 1999 and 2009.

Out of the three official languages, Bislama is the most spoken in Vanuatu, followed by English, and lastly French.

English and French 
From the times when Vanuatu was a British-French condominium, there is still an unofficial separation line between regions where English or French are taught at school. According to Ethnologue, English is the first language of 6,000 people (2% of the population) and it is spoken as a second language by 120,000 people (40%). French is the first language of 1,800 people (1%) and is spoken as a second language by 87,000 people (29%).

The majority of the country's population (63.2% in 2009) speak an indigenous language as their first language, with Bislama as a second language. As for English and French, they belong to a third circle, in spite of their official status.

List of Vanuatu’s indigenous languages

Vanuatu is home to more than a hundred indigenous languages: a recent count lists 138. Among them, three became extinct in recent decades.  Many are named after the island they are spoken on, though some of the larger islands have several different languages. Espiritu Santo and Malakula are linguistically the most diverse, with about two dozen languages each.

Some language names refer to networks of dialects rather than unified languages. Uripiv, for example, is a dialect continuum spoken across several islands in Malampa Province. In such cases, the decision as to how many languages should be counted is notoriously difficult, and sometimes the object of controversy. The number of 112 listed below may differ from other counts proposed in the literature, depending partly on these difficulties.

All indigenous languages of Vanuatu are Oceanic. Three are Polynesian languages of the Futunic group: Emae, Mele-Fila and Futuna-Aniwa. The remaining languages belong to these three groups of the Southern Oceanic branch of Oceanic:
North Vanuatu
Central Vanuatu
South Vanuatu

Ethnologue
Below is the Ethnologue's list of most of the indigenous languages of Vanuatu, which are still spoken or were until recently. It provides links to an OLAC list of media resources on the language.

Tip: Click on the column title to change the sort order.

François et al. (2015)
The following list of 138 Vanuatu languages is from François et al. (2015:18-21).

Notes

References
 
.
 .

Further reading
Tryon, D.T. New Hebrides languages: An internal classification. C-50, vi + 550 pages. Pacific Linguistics, The Australian National University, 1976. 
Tryon, D.T. "The Languages of the New Hebrides: Internal and External Relationships". In Wurm, S.A. and Carrington, L. editors, Second International Conference on Austronesian Linguistics: Proceedings. C-61:877-902. Pacific Linguistics, The Australian National University, 1978. 
Tryon, D.T. and Gly, R. ''Gazetteer of New Hebrides place names/Nomenclature des noms geographiques des Nouvelles-Hebrides. D-15, xxxvi + 188 pages. Pacific Linguistics, The Australian National University, 1979.

External links
 Vanuatu in 
 Linguistic map of Vanuatu (source: François et al. 2015).